Stephen Bann CBE, FBA (born 1 August 1942 in Manchester, England) is the Emeritus Professor of History of Art at the University of Bristol. He attended Winchester College and King's College, Cambridge, attaining his PhD in 1967.

He was subsequently appointed Professor of Modern Cultural Studies at the University of Kent at Canterbury, and later appointed to the Chair in History of Art at Bristol in 2000. He was made a Fellow of the British Academy in 1998, and named a CBE in 2004.

Early life
Stephen Bann was born 1 August 1942 in Manchester, England. He was educated at Winchester College and King's College, Cambridge, attaining his PhD in 1967.

Career
Stephen Bann's work has been influential in focusing scholarly attention toward connections between the history of art and visual culture. The Clothing of Clio (1984), The Inventions of History (1990) and Romanticism and the Rise of History (1995) are concerned in particular with the deepening consciousness of history particular to the 19th century. The examples that Bann takes are explained by him not from a reductive art historical perspective, but through acknowledgement of such examples' location in a broader, metahistorical network. Visual sources, sometimes even unlikely or fragmentary ones, are valued by the author as still points of reference: "a visual example provides a support for the exegesis that the reader (spectator) can follow in a directly participatory way. Its very self-contained nature (as opposed to an extract from a text) enables it to generate cross-references as well as to provide a field for practical analysis" (Romanticism and the Rise of History).

Bann's notion of "historical-mindedness" as originating in the 19th century and particularly in Paris is unique in the addition of the concept of "the poetics of the museum". Here, the subjectivity of the author of a museum or collection is established as significant in determining how particular representations of the past are structured, specifically in terms of tendencies toward synecdoche (empathetic recreation) and/or metonymy (mechanical and sequential display).

Bann's interest in semiotics, the capacity of images to bear significance, is exemplified in Under the Sign: John Bargrave as Collector, Traveler, and Witness (1994), which comments on the peculiar history and status of a 17th-century cabinet of curiosity as an aid in the self-definition of the collector. Themes of travel and acquisition are brought together on these grounds to detect meaning. Similarly, in writing on the history of gardens, Bann has found cause to cite the Scottish poet Ian Hamilton Finlay, among others indicative of a contemporary imaginative predisposition.

In Ways Around Modernism (2006), Bann affirms his approach of appreciating commentaries or histories as themselves change- and epoch-making. The argument is completed with an assessment of Post-Modernism in connection with "the historical phenomenon of 'curiosity'" which, for Bann, "has resurfaced as a widespread and noteworthy feature of present-day art". By implication, Post-Modernism may thus reveal overlooked qualities in Modernism. An insistence upon the importance of looking and unstinting attentiveness, in addition to inter-disciplinary openness, is characteristic and influential in his writing.

Bann's book Parallel Lines: Printmakers, Painters and Photographers in Nineteenth-Century France (Yale University Press, 2001) was awarded the 2002 R. H. Gapper Book Prize by the UK Society for French Studies. This prize recognises the work as the best book published by a scholar working in Britain or Ireland in French studies in 2001.

Bann has also contributed translations of Roland Barthes's The Discourse of History and Julia Kristeva's Proust and the Sense of Time (1993).

Selected publications

1960s
 + Reg Gadney, Frank Popper, and Philip Steadman, Four Essays on Kinetic Art, St. Albans, 1966
 Experimental Painting: Construction, Abstraction, Destruction, Reduction, London, 1967

1970s
 + J.E. Bowlt (eds), Russian Formalism: A Collection of Articles and Texts in Translation, Edinburgh, 1973
 (ed), The Tradition of Constructivism, New York, 1974

1980s
 The Clothing of Clio: A Study of the Representation of History in Nineteenth-Century Britain and France, Cambridge, 1984
 The True Vine: On Visual Representation and Western Tradition, Cambridge, 1989

1990s
 The Inventions of History: Essays on the Representation of the Past, Manchester, 1990
 + William Allen (eds), Interpreting Contemporary Art, London, 1991
 + Krishan Kumar (eds), Utopias and the Millennium, London, 1993
 Under the Sign: John Bargrave as Collector, Traveler, and Witness, Michigan, 1995
 (ed) Frankenstein, Creation and Monstrosity, London, 1994
 The Sculpture of Stephen Cox, London, 1995
 Romanticism and the Rise of History, New York, 1995
 "Eminent Views" with Bob Chaplin. Limited edition book, Connecticut, 1995
 Paul Delaroche, London, 1997

2000s
 Parallel Lines: Printmakers, Painters, and Photographers in Nineteenth-Century France, Yale, 2001
 The Tradition of Constructivism, London, 2001
 Jannis Kounellis, London, 2004
 The Reception of Walter Pater in Europe, London, 2004
 Ways Around Modernism (Theories of Modernism and Postmodernism in the Visual Arts), London, 2006
 Distinguished Images: Prints in the Visual Economy of Nineteenth-Century France, London, 2013
 The Garden at War: Deception, Craft, and Reason, London, 2017

References

Further reading
Cherry, Deborah (ed), About Stephen Bann, Blackwell, Oxford 2006
Conan, Michel (ed), Landscape Design and the Experience of Motion, Washington D.C, 2003

1942 births
Living people
British art historians
Alumni of King's College, Cambridge
Academics of the University of Kent
Academics of the University of Bristol
People educated at Winchester College
Commanders of the Order of the British Empire
Fellows of the British Academy
Slade Professors of Fine Art (University of Cambridge)